A tropical fruit is a fruit that typically grows in warm climates or equatorial areas.

Tropical fruits

Varieties of tropical fruit include:
Acerola (West Indian Cherry or Barbados Cherry) 
Ackee
Banana
Barbadine (granadilla; maracujá-açu in Portuguese)
Brazil nut
Breadfruit
Canistel 
Carambola (star fruit or five fingers)
Cashew
Chenet (guinep or ackee; pitomba-das-Guinas in Portuguese)
Cherimoya 
Caimito (caimite; related to the yellow abiu - egg fruit)
Cocoa 

Coconut
Coffee 
Cupuaçu
Custard apple 
Durian
Genipap
Governor's plum
Guaraná
Guava
Hog plum (taperebá in Portuguese)
Jackfruit
Longan
Lychee
Macadamia
Mamey sapote (mammee apple; abricó in Portuguese)
Mamoncillo
Mango
Mangosteen
Marang
Papaya
Passion fruit
Persimmon
Pewa (peach nut; pupunha in Portuguese)
Pili nut
Pineapple
Plantain 
Pois doux (ice-cream bean; inga-cipó in Portuguese)
Pomegranate
Pommerac (Otaheite apple; Malay apple; jambo in Portuguese)
Pommecythere (golden apple or June plum; cajamanga or cajarana in Portuguese)
Rambutan
Sapodilla (naseberry)
Soursop (graviola in Portuguese)
Sugar apple (ata in Portuguese)
Sweetsop
Tamarind 
Wax apple (bell apple)
White sapote

See also

 List of culinary fruits

External links
 

Fruit